Reginald Weston (16 January 1918 – 17 February 1998) was an English professional footballer who played as a centre half for Northfleet and Swansea Town. He also appeared for the Wales national football team, and managed Burton Albion.

References

Swansea City A.F.C. players
Derby County F.C. players
Burton Albion F.C. players
Burton Albion F.C. managers
English footballers
Association football central defenders
1918 births
1998 deaths
People from Greenhithe